The Rudra veena (also spelled Rudraveena or Rudra vina)—also called Bīn in North India—is a large plucked string instrument used in Hindustani Music, especially dhrupad. It is one of the major types of veena played in Indian classical music, notable for its deep bass resonance. 
 
The rudra veena is mentioned in court records as early as the reign of Zain-ul Abidin (1418-1470), and attained particular importance among Mughal court musicians. Before Independence, rudra veena players, as dhrupad practitioners, were supported by the princely states; after Independence and the political integration of India, this traditional patronage system ended. With the end of this traditional support, dhrupad's popularity in India declined, as did the popularity of the rudra veena. However, in recent years, the rudra veena has seen a resurgence in popularity, driven at least partly by interest among non-Indian practitioners.

Names and etymology
The name "rudra veena" comes from Rudra,  a name for the Lord Shiva; rudra vina means "the veena of Shiva" (compare Saraswati veena). According to oral tradition, Shiva created the rudra vina, with the two tumba resonator gourds, representing the breasts of either his wife Parvati or the goddess of arts and learning Saraswati, and the long dandi tube as the merudanda, both the human spine and the cosmic axis. The length of the fretted area of the dandi is traditionally given as nine fists—the distance from the navel to the top of the skull.

However it is strongly believed that Shiva created the rudra veena for the entertainment of the other gods as Shiva always enjoyed dancing and singing.

Another explanation is that the asura Ravana is said to have invented the rudra veena; inspired as he was with his devotion to Lord Shiva, or Rudra, he named the instrument Rudra veena. 

The North Indian vernacular name "bīn" (sometimes written "bīṇ") is derived from the preexisting root "veena," the term generally used today to refer to a number of South Asian stringed instruments. While the origins of "veena" are obscure, one possible derivation is from a pre-Aryan root meaning "bamboo" (possibly Dravidian, as in the Tamil veṟam, "cane," or South Indian bamboo flute, the venu), a reference to early stick or tube zithers—as seen in the modern bīn, whose central dandi tube is still sometimes made from bamboo.

Form and construction
The rudra veena is classified either as a stick zither or tube zither in the Sachs-Hornbostel classification system. The veena's body (dandi) is a tube of bamboo or teak between 137 to 158 cm (54 to 62 inches) long, attached to two large tumba resonators made from calabash gourds. The tumbas on a rudra veena are around 34 to 37 cm (13 to 15 inches) in diameter; while veena players once attached tumbas to the dandi with leather thongs, modern instruments use brass screw tubes to attach the tumbas.

Traditionally, the bottom end of the dandi, where the strings attach below the bridge (jawari), is finished with a peacock carving. This peacock carving is hollow, to enhance the resonance of the instrument. This hollow opens into the tube of the dandi, and is covered directly by the main jawari. The other end of the instrument, holding most or all of the pegs, is finished with a carved makara. Like the peacock at the other end and the dandi tube connecting them, the makara pegbox is also hollow.

The rudra veena has twenty-one to twenty-four moveable frets (parda) on top of the dandi. These frets are made of thin plates of brass with flat tops but curved wooden bases to match the shape of the dandi, each about two to four centimeters (0.75-1.5 inches) high. While these frets were once attached to the instrument with wax, contemporary veena players use waxed flax ties to attach the frets. This allows for players to adjust the frets to the individual microtones (shruti) of a raga. By pulling the string up or down alongside the fret, the veena player can bend the pitch (meend) by as much as a fifth.

A modern rudra veena has a total of seven or eight strings: four main melody strings, two or three chikari strings (which are used in rhythmic sections of the rag to delineate or emphasize the pulse, or taal), and one drone (laraj) string. These strings are made of steel or bronze, and run from the pegs (and over the nut if coming from the pegbox) down to the peacock, passing over the jawari near the peacock. A rudra veena will have three jawari; a main one covering an opening on the hollow peacock, and two smaller ones on the sides of the peacock, supporting the chikari and drone strings. These jawari and other strings supports are traditionally made of Sambar stag antler; however, India has banned trade in Sambar deer antler since 1995, due to the deer's declining population and vulnerable status. Strings are tuned by turning the ebony pegs to tighten or loosen the strings; the antler string supports can be moved for fine tuning.

Unlike European stringed instruments, where strings are almost always tuned to the same notes on all instruments—a modern cello, for example, will usually have its open strings tuned to C2 (two octaves below middle C), followed by G2, D3, and then A3—the rudra veena follows Hindustani classical practice of a movable root note or tonic (moveable do). The four melody strings are tuned to the ma a fifth below the tonic; the tonic (sa); the pa a fifth above the tonic; and the sa an octave above the tonic. Thus, if the lowest ma string was tuned to D2, then the four melody strings would be tuned to D2, A2, E3, and A3; if the lowest ma string was instead tuned to B♭1, then the four melody strings would be tuned to B♭1, F2, C3, and F3

History
It is an ancient instrument rarely played today. The rudra veena declined in popularity in part due to the introduction in the early 19th century of the surbahar, which allowed sitarists to more easily present the alap sections of slow dhrupad-style ragas. In the 20th century, Zia Mohiuddin Dagar modified and redesigned the rudra veena to use bigger gourds, a thicker tube (dandi), thicker steel playing strings (0.45-0.47 mm) and closed javari that. This produced a soft and deep sound when plucked without the use of any plectrum (mizrab). The instrument was further modified as the shruti veena by Lalmani Misra to establish Bharat's Shadja Gram and obtain the 22 shrutis.

Gallery

See also

Mohan Veena

References

External links 

Rudra Veena
Rudra Veena

Hindustani musical instruments
String instruments
Chordophones
Indian musical instruments